Kuhlhasseltia is a genus of orchids (family Orchidaceae) belonging to the subfamily Orchidoideae. It is native to China, Southeast Asia and New Guinea.

Species 
 Kuhlhasseltia gilesii Ormerod, Lindleyana 17: 207 (2002). 
 Kuhlhasseltia javanica J.J.Sm., Icon. Bogor.: t. 301 (1910). 
 Kuhlhasseltia muricata (J.J.Sm.) J.J.Sm., Icon. Bogor.: t. 301 (1910). 
 Kuhlhasseltia nakaiana (F.Maek.) Ormerod, Lindleyana 17: 209 (2002). 
 Kuhlhasseltia papuana J.J.Sm., Nova Guinea 12: 9 (1913). 
 Kuhlhasseltia rajana J.J.Sm., Mitt. Inst. Allg. Bot. Hamburg 7: 26 (1927). 
 Kuhlhasseltia sibelae Ormerod, Lindleyana 17: 209 (2002). 
 Kuhlhasseltia whiteheadii (Rendle) Ames, Orchidaceae 5: 32 (1915). 
 Kuhlhasseltia yakushimensis (Yamam.) Ormerod, Lindleyana 17: 209 (2003).

References 

Goodyerinae
Cranichideae genera